Ockendon is the name of two nearby places:

 North Ockendon in Havering, London
 South Ockendon in Thurrock, Essex 
 Ockendon railway station 
 South Ockendon Windmill, Essex, England

See also
 Ockenden (disambiguation)